Elisabeth Murdoch  (born 22 August 1968) is an Australian-born British and American media executive based in the United Kingdom. She was a non-executive chairperson of Shine Group, the UK-based TV programme production company she founded in 2001, until the company's parent 21st Century Fox merged its Shine division with ApolloGlobal Management's Endemol and Core Media production houses, specializing in reality TV, in 2015.

Early life
Elisabeth Murdoch (junior) was born on 22 August 1968 in Sydney. Her father is media tycoon Rupert Murdoch (born 1931), and her mother is his ex-wife, journalist and author Anna Maria dePeyster (née Torv; born 1944). Elisabeth Murdoch was named after her grandmother, Dame Elisabeth Murdoch (senior) (1909–2012). She completed her secondary education at the Brearley School in New York City and graduated with a bachelor's degree from Vassar College in Poughkeepsie, New York.

Career
Murdoch began her career as a manager of programme acquisitions at her father's FX Networks, a cable television unit based in Los Angeles. Operating as EP Communications, on 22 September 1994 Murdoch and her then-husband, Elkin Kwesi Pianim, purchased a pair of NBC-affiliate television stations, KSBW and KSBY, in California on a US$35 million loan secured by her father.

Murdoch moved with Pianim to the United Kingdom where Rupert Murdoch was running BSkyB. The early years of BSkyB saw a haemorrhage of cash from Murdoch's News Corporation funds. To help turn around the financial fortunes of the company, New Zealand television executive Sam Chisholm was brought on board to manage the day-to-day operations and build the subscriber base, with Elisabeth Murdoch as his second-in-command and de facto apprentice. By the time Chisholm left the company, BSkyB was the most profitable company in the United Kingdom. As managing director, Elisabeth oversaw BSkyB's £12 million sponsorship of the troubled Millennium Dome, to the relief of its Cabinet overseer, Peter Mandelson. However, she also faced criticism after brokering her father's failed £623.4 million bid for England's champion Manchester United team.

After quarrelling publicly with Chisholm, she ventured out on her own as a television and film producer in London. She advocated Sky setting up a film and production unit similar to BBC Films and Film4 Productions. However, due to lack of success, this unit closed down. She founded Shine Limited in March 2001, with 80 percent ownership retained by herself, 15 percent by Lord Alli, and five percent by BSkyB. BSkyB signed a deal guaranteeing to buy an agreed amount of Shine programming for two years.

In 2011, Shine was acquired by News Corporation in a controversial deal that raised questions about nepotism.

In February 2013, Murdoch was assessed as the fifth most powerful woman in the United Kingdom by Woman's Hour on BBC Radio 4.

In 2018, Murdoch produced a dating reality show called Phone Swap, that was originally aired on Snapchat.

Murdoch has served on many organizational boards including Afiniti. She is now Executive Chairman of the global TV and film production and development company, Sister, which is headquartered in London with offices in Los Angeles. She set up her production company Sister in 2019. Her Sister production company had a deal with Chris Goldberg and his Winterlight Pictures company. She most recently had a deal with actor Jeremy Strong.

Murdoch was appointed Commander of the Order of the British Empire (CBE) in the 2022 Birthday Honours for services to diversity in the arts and to charity.

Personal life
Murdoch's first marriage was to a fellow Vassar graduate, Elkin Kwesi Pianim, an associate in the New York corporate finance department of the Rothschild investment bank. He is the son of Ghananian-born economist and financier Kwame Pianim and Dutch-born Cornelia Pianim. The wedding was held on 10 September 1993 at St. Timothy Catholic Church near the Beverly Hills residence of the bride's parents. They have two children, Cornelia Pianim (born 1994 in New York) and Anna Pianim (born 1997 in London). They were divorced in 1998.

Murdoch's second marriage was to public relations executive Matthew Freud, the son of former MP Sir Clement Freud and great-grandson of Sigmund Freud. The couple married on 18 August 2001 in a ceremony at Blenheim Palace. The couple had two children. From 2008, the family resided at Burford Priory in Oxfordshire, where they were key members of the Chipping Norton set. They also owned a home in Notting Hill, London. The couple divorced in 2014.

In 2017, Murdoch married artist Keith Tyson.

Murdoch is a dual national of the United States and the United Kingdom. She currently resides in the St John's Wood neighbourhood of London.

References

External links
Shine Group

Elisabeth Murdoch: The savvy, skill and style to head up the empire, Ian Burrell, The Independent, 22 February 2011
 'The Heiress', Ken Auletta, The New Yorker, 10 December 2012

Elisabeth
1968 births
Living people
Vassar College alumni
Businesspeople from Sydney
American people of Australian descent
American people of English descent
American people of Irish descent
American people of Scottish descent
Businesspeople from New York City
American media executives
British media executives
Brearley School alumni
Australian emigrants to England
American emigrants to England 
Australian people of English descent
Australian people of Estonian descent
Australian people of Irish descent 
Australian people of Scottish descent
Commanders of the Order of the British Empire
Freud family